
Gmina Dobra is an urban-rural gmina (administrative district) in Turek County, Greater Poland Voivodeship, in west-central Poland.

Villages
Apart from the town of Dobra, Gmina Dobra contains the villages and settlements of Chrapczew, Czajków, Czyste, Dąbrowa, Dąbrowica, Długa Wieś, Januszówka, Józefów, Kościanki, Łęg Piekarski, Linne, Mikulice, Miłkowice, Młyny Piekarskie, Moczydła, Ostrówek, Piekary, Potworów, Rzechta, Rzymsko, Rzymsko BG, Skęczniew, Stawki, Stefanów, Strachocice, Strachocice-Kolonia, Szymany, Ugory, Wola Piekarska, Zagaj, Zborów and Żeronice.

Neighbouring gminas
Gmina Dobra is bordered by the gminas of Goszczanów, Kawęczyn, Pęczniew, Poddębice, Przykona, Turek, Uniejów and Warta.

References
Polish official population figures 2006

Dobra
Gmina Dobra